Sunlit Youth is the third studio album by American indie rock band Local Natives, released on September 9, 2016 with Loma Vista Recordings.

Background
Sunlit Youth was recorded between 2014 and 2016 in Thailand, Malaysia, Nicaragua, Hawaii, and Ojai, California.

Release
The album was preceded by the singles "Past Lives," "Villainy," "Fountain of Youth," and "Coins". Before its release, "Past Lives" was featured in the episode "7th" from the first season of the Netflix series Flaked, which was released on March 11, 2016.

Goofs
The album has a noticeable misprint of the song "Psycho Lovers" (track #10), which on the CD is labeled as "Pyscho Lovers".

Critical reception

Sunlit Youth received generally favorable reviews from contemporary music critics. At Metacritic, which assigns a normalized rating out of 100 to reviews from mainstream critics, the album received an average score of 75, based on 12 reviews, which indicates "generally favorable reviews".

Track listing

Personnel
Credits adapted from the liner notes of Sunlit Youth.

Local Natives
 Taylor Rice – performer
 Kelcey Ayer – performer
 Ryan Hahn – performer
 Matt Frazier – performer
 Nik Ewing – performer

Additional personnel

 Local Natives – production
 Brian Joseph – production (1-3, 5–8, 10, 12), recording (1-7, 10-12)
 Rob Kirwan – production (4), recording (4, 8)
 Catherine Marks – production (5), recording (5)
 Little Dragon – production (6)
 Ryan Hahn – production (6, 9), recording (6, 9)
 Lars Stalfors – production (10), recording (10)
 Michael Harris – recording (1-4, 7-9)
 Shawn Everett – recording (1-3, 7, 10, 11), mixing (11)
 Dave Gaumé – recording (2, 8, 12)

 Rouble Kapoor – recording (12)
 Craig Silvey – mixing (1-5, 7, 8, 10, 12)
 Eduardo de la Paz – mixing (6, 9)
 Bob Ludwig – mastering
 Brian Roettinger – art direction, photography
 Evan McQuaid – photography
 Taylor Giali – design assistance
 Ryan Whalley – artists and repertoire (A&R)
 Phil Costello – artist management

Charts

References

2016 albums
Local Natives albums
Loma Vista Recordings albums
Albums recorded at Electro-Vox Recording Studios